Chandraghona is a town on the Karnaphuli River in the Chittagong Division of Bangladesh.

Geography
The town is located on the Kaptai Road between Kaptai Upazila and Ranguni, 48 kilometers from the city of Chittagong.
One of the larger fields of the Bangladeshi crop Gumai Jheel is in the area.

Cultures represented here include those of the Chakma people and Marma people. There are historic Buddhist temples in the region.
Chandroghona is birthplace of Nelson Baroi.

Economy
One of the larger paper mills in South Asia, the Karnaphuli Paper Mills Limited, is located in Karnaphuli. It was the first paper manufacturing industrial establishment registered under the Factories Act in then East Pakistan. At the time of its establishment, it was the biggest paper mill in Asia, with over 3,000 workers.

There is also a rayon factory in town.

See also
Christian Hospital is situated here.

References 

Stables, J (2006). Making a difference: Visits to Bangladesh. The Journal of Perioperative Practice.

Populated places in Chittagong Division
Karnaphuli River
Towns in Bangladesh